The name Dandenong is derived from the Woiwurrung language of the Wurundjeri people, that was applied to the watercourse now known as Dandenong Creek. The name has been appropriated to extend beyond its actual meaning and is now applied to two settlements, a mountain summit and the Dandenong Ranges mountain range. The creek however, originates in the mountain range, so this connection is more understandable.

It is not known where the name Dandenong came from nor what it means, or even its correct spelling, other variations include; Tanjenong, Tangynon and Bangeong. In any case, the name relates at least to watercourses in general, and not to mountains or ranges, as indicated by the ong ending.

Dandenong can refer to:

Administrative areas 

Electoral district of Dandenong - an electoral district of the Victorian Legislative Assembly
City of Greater Dandenong - a local government area of Victoria, Australia

Mountains and ranges 

Dandenong Ranges or the Dandenongs - a mountain range east of Melbourne
Mount Dandenong (Victoria) - the summit of the Dandenong Ranges, at

Places 

Dandenong, Victoria - a city in Melbourne's southeastern suburbs, the 5th largest city in Victoria
Dandenong North, Victoria - pop 22,000
Dandenong South, Victoria - pop 4,800
Dandenong Ranges National Park
Mount Dandenong, Victoria - a township on the summit of Mount Dandenong

Sporting teams 

Dandenong Rangers - an Australian Women's Basketball League (WNBL) team

The Dandenong Southern Stingrays are an Australian rules football team in the NAB League.

Waterways 

Dandenong Creek - a creek in Melbourne's eastern and southeastern suburbs
Dandenong Creek Trail - a shared pedestrian/bicycle path that follows the course of the creek